Dorcus titanus is a beetle of the family Lucanidae. It was described by Jean Baptiste Boisduval in 1835. Huang and Chen (2013) separated Serognathus from Dorcus by representing morphological characters and DNA analysis.

Description
Males measure  including mandibles; females . It has an elongated, somewhat flat body dull black with blackish antennae and legs. Male's antler-like jaws have small teeth along inner edge and a pair of big teeth toward the bottom, and are forked at end. The head of a large male reaches nearly the length of its prothorax and abdomen combined.

Life cycle
Adults can be seen from May to August. They feed on tree juice, especially of Quercus species. Females lay eggs on the underground part of fallen oaks. The eggs hatch in about a month and the larvae feed on rotten wood. The larval period lasts about one year. The complete life cycle can last approximately from 1 to 2 years.

Distribution
This species is widely distributed in Indonesia, the Philippines, Malaysia, Thailand, Vietnam, Laos, Myanmar, India, Japan, China, Taiwan and Korea.

Habitat
It mainly inhabits tropical rainforests and temperate forests from lowland to mountains.

Human uses
This beetle has some commercial value and export from some regions is criminalized. There are some Asian cultures that assign aphrodisiac properties to this insect. However, most are imported for sport, decorative show, or to be kept as an exotic pet. This stag beetle is also popular pet in Asia and Europe.

Gallery

List of subspecies (after 2010)
Hiroshi Fujita, a Japanese collector belonged to Mushi-sha insect shop, described over 20 new subspecies of D. titanus in his book "The Lucanid Beetles of the World". His subspecies included 11 subspecies in Japan alone. Also, he divided D. titanus titanus in the Malay Archipelago into D. titanus yasuokai, D. titanus typhon, D. titanus nobuyukii and others. Fujita's subspecies are in dispute and not widely accepted.

Currently 23 subspecies are extant:

Dorcus titanus castanicolor - Japan (Tsushima), Korea (Korean Peninsula and Jeju-do), Mainland China
Dorcus titanus daitoensis - Japan (Daitō Islands)
Dorcus titanus elegans - Japan
Dorcus titanus fafner - Vietnam
Dorcus titanus hachijoensis - Japan
Dorcus titanus imperialis - Philippines
Dorcus titanus karasuyamai - Japan
Dorcus titanus mindanaoensis - Mindanao
Dorcus titanus nobuyukii - Malaysia
Dorcus titanus okinawanus - Okinawa
Dorcus titanus okinoerabuensis - Japan
Dorcus titanus palawanicus - Philippines (Palawan Island)
Dorcus titanus pilifer - Japan
Dorcus titanus platymelus - Mainland China
Dorcus titanus sakishimanus - Japan (Sakishima Islands)
Dorcus titanus sika - Taiwan
Dorcus titanus titanus - Indonesia
Dorcus titanus takaraensis - Japan (Takara Islands)
Dorcus titanus tatsutai - Japan
Dorcus titanus tokunoshimaensis - Japan
Dorcus titanus typhon - Philippines
Dorcus titanus typhoniformis - China (Yunnan)
Dorcus titanus westermanni - India, Bhutan, Bangladesh
Dorcus titanus yasuokai - Indonesia (Sumatra)

References

Mizunuma T. & Nagai S. (1994) The Lucanid Beetles of the World. Mushi-Sha's Iconographic Series of Insects, Ed. H. Fujita, Japan. Vol. I 
Huang, H. & Chen, C.-C. 2013: Stag beetles of China II

External links
Photos of Dorcus titanus daitoensis
Photos of Dorcus titanus sika
Photos of Dorcus titanus titanus

Lucaninae
Beetles of Asia
Beetles described in 1835
Taxa named by Jean Baptiste Boisduval